Henry Wingham (died 1262) was a Lord Chancellor of England and Bishop of London.

Life

Wingham was selected as Chancellor on 5 January 1255. His office was renewed by the baronial reformers in 1258, but he was replaced on 18 October 1260 by Nicholas of Ely. He held the prebend of Newington in the diocese of London as well as being a member of the papal chapel and the dean of St Martin le Grand.

Wingham was elected to the see of London about 29 June 1259, confirmed 11 July 1259, and consecrated on 15 February 1260.

Wingham died on 13 July 1262 or 14 July 1262. There was a tomb memorial to him in the quire at Old St Paul's Cathedral.

Citations

References

External links

 

Bishops of London
Lord chancellors of England
Year of birth missing
1262 deaths
13th-century English Roman Catholic bishops